"One Kiss Led to Another" is a song written by Jerry Leiber and Mike Stoller and performed by The Coasters. The song reached #11 on the R&B chart and #73 on the Billboard Hot 100 in 1956.  The song appeared on their 1957 album, The Coasters.

The song was produced by Jerry Leiber and Mike Stoller.

Personnel
 Mike Stoller, piano
 Gil Bernal, saxophone
 Barney Kessell, guitar
 probably Adolph Jacobs, guitar
 Ralph Hamilton, bass
 Jesse Sailes, drums
 Chico Guerrero, congas

Covers
The Beach Boys recorded the song in September 1965 as an outtake for their album Beach Boys' Party! Lead vocals are by Mike Love.

The New York City group Hackamore Brick appropriated a (modified) version of this song's title for the title of their lone album on the Kama Sutra label, One Kiss Leads to Another, released in 1970. The phrase also appears in the lyrics to the album's second track, "Oh! Those Sweet Bananas."

References

Songs about kissing
1956 songs
1956 singles
Songs written by Jerry Leiber and Mike Stoller
The Coasters songs
The Beach Boys songs
Atco Records singles